Garry McDowall (born 6 March 1959) is a former soccer player. Born in Scotland, he played as a midfielder in the Scottish Football League for Hamilton Academical before emigrating to Australia, playing in the National Soccer League (NSL) from 1983 until 1991 for Footscray JUST, South Melbourne, Brunswick Juventus and Heidelberg United. He played 25 times for Australia, including 16 times in full international matches.

References

Living people
1959 births
People from Partick
Australian soccer players
Scottish footballers
Footballers from Glasgow
Scottish emigrants to Australia
Association football midfielders
Hamilton Academical F.C. players
Footscray JUST players
South Melbourne FC players
Brunswick Juventus players
Heidelberg United FC players
Australia international soccer players
Scottish Football League players
National Soccer League (Australia) players